Arthur Mountifort Longfield Ponsonby, 11th Earl of Bessborough (11 December 1912 – 5 April 2002), was a British peer.

He was the son of Maj. Hon. Cyril Myles Brabazon Ponsonby (1881–1915), second son of Edward Ponsonby, 8th Earl of Bessborough, and his wife Rita Narcissa Longfield, daughter of Lt. Col. Mountifort John Courtenay Longfield. He inherited the earldom on 5 December 1993 when his first cousin Frederick Ponsonby, 10th Earl of Bessborough, died without a male heir.

Education and career
He was educated at Harrow School and Trinity College, Cambridge. Later he rose to the rank of captain in the service of the Welsh Guards and saw action in the Second World War. In his later years he farmed at Roche Court, Winterslow, Wiltshire.

Family
On 28 July 1939, he married Patricia Minnigerode (died 12 September 1952), daughter of Col. Fitzhugh Lee Minnigerode of New York and Alexandria, Virginia. Together they had two children:
Hon. Myles Fitzhugh Longfield Ponsonby (born 16 February 1941), later the 12th Earl of Bessborough
Lady Sarah Ponsonby (13 October 1943 – 13 March 2010)

Following the death of his first wife, he remarried, on 20 September 1956, Anne Marie Galitzine (née Slatin), former wife of Prince George Galitzine and daughter of Lt. Gen. Sir Rudolf Carl von Slatin (Baron von Slatin). They were divorced in 1963.

He married for the third time on 17 December 1963, Madeleine Lola Margaret Grand, daughter of Maj. Gen. Laurence Douglas Grand, and together they had two children:
Hon. Matthew Douglas Longfield Ponsonby (born 27 January 1965), married Jamilie Emett Searle
Hon. Charles Arthur Longfield Ponsonby (born 12 July 1967), married Jennifer Waghorn

Lady Bessborough is the founder of the New Art Centre, formerly of Sloane Street, London, which runs the New Art Centre Sculpture Park and Gallery at Roche Court, Wiltshire. She is a trustee of the Roche Court Educational Trust charity.

Death and succession
He died on 5 April 2002 and was succeeded by his eldest son Myles Ponsonby, 12th Earl of Bessborough.

Ancestry

References 

 Cracroft's Peerage

External links

1912 births
2002 deaths
People educated at Harrow School
Arthur
Welsh Guards officers

Bessborough